The 2016–17 Bobsleigh World Cup was a multi-race series over a season for bobsleigh. The season started on 28 November 2016 in Whistler, Canada and ended on 19 March 2017 in Pyeongchang, South Korea. The World Cup was organised by the IBSF (formerly the FIBT) who also run World Cups and Championships in skeleton. The season was sponsored by BMW.

Calendar 
Below is the schedule of the 2016/17 season.

Results

Two-man

Four-man

Two-woman

Standings

Two-man

Four-man

Two-woman

References

External links 
 IBSF

Bobsleigh World Cup
2016 in bobsleigh
2017 in bobsleigh
Bobsleigh